The military career of Keith Miller, an Australian Test cricketer and Australian rules footballer, lasted from August 1940 until June 1946, when World War II interrupted his sporting career. Miller enlisted in the Militia, before switching to the Royal Australian Air Force (RAAF), where he served from November 1941 until 1946 when he was discharged with the rank of flying officer. Miller trained as a fighter pilot, and in the last month of the European theatre of war, he flew combat missions over German installations. However, Miller was more notable for his efforts as a cricketer, representing the Royal Australian Air Force cricket team and after VE Day, the Australian Services in the Victory Tests of 1945, followed by a tour of the Indian subcontinent and Australia before being demobilised.

While serving in the Militia, Miller continued playing football for St Kilda Saints and interstate cricket for Victoria when he was off duty. Miller struggled to conform to military norms and was soon fined for "using insulting language towards a superior officer". In late 1941, he left the Militia and was accepted into the Royal Australian Navy, but tore up his form because his friend was rejected, before enlisting in the RAAF. After his initial training in 1942, he earned his wings and was deployed to the United Kingdom in early 1943 where he continued his training with No. 169 Squadron RAF. Miller survived a few disciplinary incidents while training to eventually take part in combat operations in the closing stages of the European theatre of the war, and had several narrow escapes from death throughout his combat and training period. He received several campaign medals for his service.

Away from battle, from 1943 onwards, Miller was selected to represent the RAAF in a series of matches against the Royal Air Force and other English teams. The objective of the matches was to show that the British Commonwealth would not be cowed by German attacks, and the team was officially designated as a military unit. In 1945, following the Nazi surrender, the RAAF team merged with members of the Australian Imperial Force team to become the Australian Services, involving army and air force personnel, and competed against England in the five Victory Tests. Following the end-of-war tour of England, the Services team toured the Indian subcontinent before returning to Australia and playing in the 1945–46 season against the Australian states before being demobilised. Miller was the vice-captain of the team on the return leg of the tour to Australia.

Miller was Australia's top-scorer during the Victory Tests and came to the fore with his fast bowling. Miller was acclaimed for his free-spirited and adventurous batting, which he attributed to the triviality of sport in comparison to war. This was particularly exhibited in his 185 from 165 minutes for Dominions against England. It was through his involvement in wartime cricket that Miller met many of his future international colleagues, such as England's Denis Compton, Bill Edrich and Len Hutton.

In Australia
As was the case with many of his contemporaries, Miller's sporting career was interrupted by World War II. On 20 August 1940, towards the end of the football season, almost a year after war broke out, Miller joined the Militia (army reserve), and was assigned to the 4th Reserve Motor Transport Company. In late September, with St Kilda already eliminated from the football season, Miller began his first army training camp at Caulfield Racecourse in Melbourne. This meant that he would be able to continue his sporting career when he was not in training. A non-conformist, he had the first of his many clashes with authority on 4 November, when he was charged with "using insulting language to a superior officer" and fined 10 shillings. Miller's knockabout persona soon saw him earn the nickname Dusty, referring to his tendency to be involved in a "dust-up", meaning a physical fight.

During the summer of 1940–41, Miller was granted leave so that he could play interstate cricket. In a season shortened due to war, Miller played in three matches and scored 140 runs at 28.00. In the second match, which was against South Australia, Miller scored 63, his only fifty of the summer, and bowled for the first time at first-class level, conceding three runs from a solitary over. In the third match he took his maiden first-class wicket, in a war fundraising match for Stan McCabe's XI against Don Bradman's XI, that of Ken Ridings, caught behind with wicket-keeper Don Tallon. His pace was noticed by Bradman.

The 1941 VFL season went ahead despite the loss of many players to military service. Miller alternated between playing in the backline and in attack depending on match conditions. When St Kilda were kicking downwind, Miller would play in attack, and when they kicked against the wind, he would return to a defensive position. In the forward line, he alternated with Sam Loxton, a future Invincibles teammate. He booted 28 goals in 16 games, including eight in one match against North Melbourne. Miller also gained a reputation among opponents for kicking them in the ankles. He again showed his disrespect for authority and reputation. In one match against Melbourne, for whom his boss and state cricket teammate Percy Beames played, Miller charged towards Beames with a raised elbow at the start of the match, forcing his boss to be taken from the field. Miller came second in St Kilda's best and fairest for 1941 as his team again came second to last.

Miller's season ended early after he was called back for army service and he was stationed in the northern suburb of Broadmeadows. However, he had disciplinary problems and disliked taking orders from his officers, whom he often felt were inferior to him. He left the Militia on 8 November 1941. Miller and a friend then attempted to join the Royal Australian Navy (RAN) as stokers. When the navy would not take his friend, Miller tore up his paperwork in protest, left the recruiting office, and walked around the corner to the Royal Australian Air Force (RAAF) recruiting office. He was acutely aware of the risks, as many of his playing colleagues had been killed, injured or captured. The threat of combat increased when the Pacific Theatre of World War II opened on 7 December 1941 with the Japanese attack on Pearl Harbor. The 1941–42 cricket season was cancelled and many cricket and football grounds were converted into army bases.

On 30 January 1942 he was called to active service by the RAAF. He was sent to No. 4 Initial Training School at Victor Harbor in South Australia, around 100 km south of Adelaide. Miller quickly showed his anti-authoritarian streak in a training drill in which Miller's instructor asked the recruits to disarm him. The recruits feared that their weekend leave would be cancelled if they succeeded in confiscating their sergeant's rifle, but the sergeant assured them that this was not the case. Miller volunteered to combat the instructor, and succeeded by tripping him and removing his firearm. The sergeant angrily protested that Miller had tripped him and told Miller to repeat his feat. Miller again tripped the sergeant and disarmed him, this time contemptuously wiping his boot on his NCO's shirt and soiling it. The irate instructor cancelled Miller's leave and put him on guard duty, further threatening the other recruits with the same fate for protesting Miller's treatment. However, the recruits protested the ruling with the camp adjutant, who overruled the sergeant, putting him on guard duty instead of Miller.

Soon after, on 19 February 1942, the Japanese launched air raids on Australian soil, targeting the northern city of Darwin. Miller trained at flying schools at Cunderdin, Western Australia and Mallala, South Australia, just north of Adelaide and gained his wings in late 1942. He played only one match during the football season, playing in a combined West Adelaide and Glenelg Football Club team while posted in South Australia. His team lost. On 17 December he returned to Melbourne and was promoted to the rank of flight sergeant. On 15 January 1943, he embarked on the USS West Point at Port Melbourne, which was to take him to Europe in readiness for war combat. The journey included a stopover in February at a training camp in Boston in the United States. It was there that Miller met Peg Wagner, his future wife. They were engaged before Miller left for the United Kingdom. He arrived in Scotland on 18 March 1943 and was deployed to the southern English coastal town of Bournemouth. The once-popular tourist resort had been turned into a military centre and was the target of frequent German air raids.

Britain
Miller continued his training at Bournemouth, spending his spare time pursuing his love of classical music and cricket. Miller had the first of many brushes with death in April, when he was invited to play weekend cricket for a RAAF team in London. While he was away for his first weekend match, the local Bournemouth pub where he ate lunch on Sunday was struck by a German air strike. Miller's weekly lunchmates were all killed. His selection for the RAAF cricket team had saved him. Miller quickly gained a reputation among the servicemen for his carefree batting and bowling. He often bowled without a proper run-up but managed to trouble batsmen with pace and bounce regardless. The RAAF team was officially formed in preparation for the 1943 season and Miller was selected. The captain was flying officer Keith Carmody.  Miller played his first match at Lord's, the home of cricket, against Warner's XI, a team that included former England captains Bob Wyatt and Gubby Allen and future Test players Alec and Eric Bedser and Trevor Bailey. Oblivious to authority, Miller pushed a person in the dressing room out of his way before the match started, unaware that it was Warner, the secretary of the Marylebone Cricket Club himself. Warner's XI batted first, and Miller dismissed Wyatt and Allen in taking 2/20 from ten overs as the hosts made 201. Miller came to the crease at the fall of the first wicket and hit consecutive fours off the bowling of Dick Pollard from the Royal Air Force (RAF). The RAAF were bowled out for 100, with Miller top-scoring with 45. In the second innings, he made 21 not out with two sixes as time ran out and the match ended in a draw. In a match for the United Services against Sussex, Miller top-scored with 134 not out in 120 minutes, striking 12 fours and three sixes. He then tore through Sussex with 7/36, breaking through the defences of six players who were bowled or leg before wicket, as his team won by 225 runs. He also played one match for Sussex against the RAF, scoring 11 and taking 3/41.

The RAAF played eight matches for the season, winning four and losing the rest. Miller's top score was 141 in faster-than-even time against Public School Wanderers at Hove. He went on to play for Dominions, a composite team from the British Commonwealth, in a two-day match against England in August, scoring 32 and two and bowling a total of eight overs for 46 runs without taking a wicket. England fielded a team of almost Test standard, with six capped Test players and four others who made their debut immediately after the resumption of international cricket following the war. The match marked the first meeting between Miller and his good friend, England batsman Denis Compton. In their first battle at the crease, Miller aimed a short ball that took off past Compton's shoulder and went for four byes. By the end of his season, Miller's bowling began to attract media attention. He ended the season in a match at Lord's between the airmen: the RAAF against the RAF. Miller took 3/23 and scored 91 in the RAAF's total of 8/164. None of the matches during the 1943 season were accorded first-class status.

By late 1943, Miller has been based at RAF South Cerny in Gloucestershire. One night, he was pulled over by his commanding officer, whom he detested, for not wearing his uniform cap. An altercation resulted, and Miller posed as though he were about to punch his officer. The result was that Miller was charged with insubordination and sentenced to a three-week disciplinary course with hard labour, from 18 October to 9 November. In mid-November he was posted to Ouston near Newcastle upon Tyne where he was trained in the use of radar using Anson and Oxford aircraft. During his stay there, Miller was thrown on his back during a wrestling match, sustaining an injury that caused him recurring problems in later years, diminishing his ability to bowl.

In 1944, Miller was again selected for the RAAF team. Near-death experiences and the knowledge that he could be the next to die, changed Miller's outlook to life. An RAAF teammate was killed on a mission soon after hitting a century. In a match against the British Civil Defence Services at Lord's in July, Miller had reached 96 when an air raid siren signalled the arrival of a German flying bomb. It landed south of the ground and then Miller struck a four to register his ton before another flying bomb crashed close to the ground as he saluted the crowd. In a match against England, which boasted five capped and four future England Test players, Miller scored 85 in 100 minutes. While Miller was at the crease, the RAAF was on track to reach its target but his partners were dismissed around him and the RAAF fell 33 runs short after losing its last seven wickets for 51 runs. He took match figures of 6/28 against the West of England at Bristol, and top-scored in the second innings of a low-scoring match with 14. Miller was also selected for the Dominions match against England, scoring 30 in a drawn encounter. The success of the season, especially Miller and Keith Carmody's attractive batting, prompted Warner to begin planning for a "Test" series between the respective armed services of England and Australia.

After ten months of training, Miller was offered a commission as a pilot officer. His best friend missed out, so he arranged for Flight Lieutenant Keith Johnson an Australian cricket official, to pull some strings, ensuring his friend's promotion. The pair were posted to 12 Advanced Flying Unit in Grantham, Lincolnshire on 15 August 1944, which was an Operations Training Unit for the purpose of familiarising officers with flying aircraft. However, on a trip back to Ouston to visit their colleagues, a night of drunken revelry led to property damage and injury to another airman. Miller and his friend were charged with eight offences and faced possible expulsion. Luckily for Miller, the Commanding Officer (CO) at his new posting at Cranfield, Buckinghamshire was his old CO at Ouston. Miller was given another three-week disciplinary course, but his pleas convinced the CO to reduce the sentence to a fine for the property damage. Miller was allowed to resume his training in Beauforts, Beaufighters and Mosquitos. Again he had a near miss, when some instruments on his plane failed and he was forced to land his Beaufighter for repairs. After the repairs, another pilot used the plane and the problem recurred. The second pilot crash-landed and was killed. Later, Miller was returning from a training mission over France and misjudged the runway, bouncing his plane on the tarmac. Trying to lift off again, only one engine responded and the unequal power supply caused the plane to swerve, missing the hangar by centimetres. He then escaped death by skipping a social appointment that he had agreed to attend. A V1 rocket hit the venue and killed many of the patrons inside. In October, he went AWOL to watch violinist Yehudi Menuhin perform in London and was dismissed, but the CO revoked his decision on the condition that Miller play for his cricket team.

Officer
At the end of his officer training, Miller was sent aboard a Royal Navy destroyer as part of an exchange programme between the forces. Miller and a friend reported to the harbour late after a night of socialising and were punished by having to wait for their turn on the second vessel. During a voyage to escort 30 merchant ships to Belgium, the vessel was involved in a battle with a German U-boat, which was sunk. Upon his return to England, Miller was promoted to flying officer on 4 November 1944. Miller was a nervy pilot, with his navigator saying that every landing was "a close shave".

In March 1945, Miller was deployed to the RAF station at Great Massingham in Norfolk, East Anglia. He was assigned to No. 169 Squadron RAF, flying Mosquito fighter-bombers. Miller's squadron took part in missions against Nazi Germany in April and May 1945. They attacked V1 and V2 production sites on the island of Peenemünde in the North Sea with the objective of depleting the Germans' offensive capability. On 19 April, Miller took part in an attack on a German installation at Flensburg in Germany. The Mosquitoes flew below 300 m in a four-hour trip. In May, his squadron was deployed in Operation Fire Bash, to attack Westerland Airfield on the island of Sylt off the coast of Denmark. The Nazis had 5,000 soldiers, 15,000 sailors and 800 artillery pieces defending it. Over 300 British and American airmen had died in an attempt to capture it. Miller and his colleagues had tanks loaded with napalm, which were to be dropped on the Germans. One of Miller's loads remained dangling from a wing, refusing to drop. He flew back to base with the explosives, and it fell off on landing at the air base. Luckily for Miller, it failed to detonate. However, five of the 24 planes that were involved in the raid were not so lucky, and were shot down. Miller avoided further European missions as bad weather forced the cancellation of additional raids over the next few days, by which time Germany had surrendered. His CO, Neville Reeves, organised for him to fly air force personnel over Germany to view the results of Allied bombing, called "Reeves' Ruhr Tours". On one flight, Reeves was leading a formation of aircraft when Miller broke away from the group and returned to base late. When asked why he had gone separately, Miller said that he wanted to fly over Bonn, the birthplace of Beethoven. He was not disciplined for the incident.

Victory Tests 

The end of the war marked the start of the 1945 cricket season. Miller returned to Lord's and top-scored with 50 for the RAAF against a British Empire XI, as his team opened the season with a six-wicket win. Warner had organised a series of matches between England and Australian servicemen, known as the Victory Tests, to celebrate the end of hostilities. However, Australian cricket administrators would not accredit the three-day matches as official Test matches, arguing that there were not enough Test-level players in the armed services. England were close to full strength, so the AIF and the RAAF teams merged to strengthen their quality. As a result, the Australian Services cricket team was formed under the leadership of Warrant Officer Lindsay Hassett to compete in the Victory Tests. Hassett was the only capped Test player, but six others had first-class experience in Australia. The First Victory Test was at Lord's and was expected to usher in a new post-war era, which it hoped would be more aggressive and attractive. The last Anglo-Australian Test series before the war had featured a large number of draws due to defensive play. England batted first and Miller came on as the fifth bowler. He bowled his Great Massingham pilot colleague Bill Edrich for 45 to end with 1/11, precipitating an English collapse from 4/200 to 267. In reply to England's 267, Miller came to the crease at 3/136 and joined Hassett. Miller gradually progressed, and once Australia had taken the lead, he cut loose. After spending 40 minutes in the 90s, he finished with 105 in 210 minutes, with a straight six. The Times opined that his innings was "as good a century as has been seen at Lord's in many a long day". Wisden said that he "was always getting runs with the soundness characteristic of most Australians". Harry Altham declared that "a brilliant new star had joined the cluster of the Southern Cross". Australia took a 188-run lead, and reached their second innings target with two balls to spare to win by six wickets despite Miller being run out for only one. He then took 2/2 and made a duck as the RAAF lost to the RAF by 16 runs in a one-day match.

Miller went on to play a two-day match for the RAAF against Lancashire, where his 52 was the only fifty in a low-scoring game. He also took match figures of 2/28. After scoring 30 in an innings victory over Learie Constantine's XI, Miller represented the RAAF against the RAF at Lord's where he top-scored with 63 in 90 minutes. The Second Victory Test was played at Bramall Lane in Sheffield, where the grandstands were damaged by German air raids. Hassett sent the Englishmen into bat. Miller went wicketless. He was run out in the first innings for 17. In the second innings, Miller bowled a fast and hostile spell, hitting Test world record holder Len Hutton in the arm before hitting Cyril Washbrook in the head, provoking an angry crowd reaction, comparing Miller to the Bodyline spearhead Harold Larwood. He later removed Washbrook and ended with 2/28. His efforts led to calls for him to start taking his bowling seriously, instead of simply jogging in releasing the ball, especially from former South African representative Bob Crisp. Despite this, Miller fell for eight in the second innings and Australia fell 41 runs short of the target and series was squared.

During June, there was speculation that Miller's squadron would be deployed to Burma to fight against Japan. In the meantime, the airmen continued to practice their flying, Miller earning Reeves' ire by making unauthorised leisure flights. Later, he was ordered to fly tour flights over Germany. Not wanting to do so, Miller lodged bogus reports saying that the Mosquitoes were malfunctioning, causing unnecessary maintenance work. Thus, Reeves ordered Miller to take his plane instead, which caught fire in mid-flight. With one functional engine and no navigator to assist him, Miller came back to the air base and bellylanded. The fuselage and one of the wings was broken off and the plane became engulfed in flames. Miller escaped physical injury, but was shaken by the accident. Again Miller escaped disciplinary action, and was playing sport an hour later.

The next day, Miller headed to Lord's to play for the RAAF against the South of England. Chasing 208, Miller scored an unbeaten 78 in 95 minutes. The Australians were 3/184, well placed to reach the target of 208 when rain washed out the match. He then scored 30 and took 1/14 as the RAAF defeated the Army. In the Third Victory Test at Lord's, despite his efforts in the previous Victory Test, Miller was only Hassett's sixth-choice bowler, coming on when England were 2/100. This time he measured out a run up. Miller struck John Dewes before uprooting his off stump. He then bowled Donald Carr for four and then removed Hutton's off stump. He ended with 3/44 from 18 overs. Miller was bowled for seven in the first innings but was rewarded with the new ball in the second innings. He bowled Dewes for a duck with an outswinger, before bowling Edrich and Pollard to end with 3/42. This left Australia a target of 225 in five hours. Miller came into bat at 3/104 and saw Australia to the target unbeaten on 71. C B Fry opined that Miller's innings was "superbly stroked and directed cover driving of the pace bowling formed the most telling and majestic feature".

In a two-day match against Yorkshire, Miller struck 111 including three sixes when none of the teammates passed 30. His innings featured strokes from both the front and back foot. The next day, he scored 75 in 83 minutes against Durham and took 2/1 in another win for the RAAF. That was the first of four back-to-back one-dayers for the RAAF; Miller scored two, 23 and nine against Scottish Services, Greenock and Scotland.

In the Fourth Victory Test, again at Lord's, Miller came in at 3/108 and after a slow start, scored another century, taking 170 minutes to reach the mark before being removed for 118. He struck ten fours, all off which were driven. In the second innings, he came to the crease with four wickets down with Australia still in arrears. He scored an unbeaten 35 to ensure that Australia would not collapse further and lose the match. The public reception towards the Victory Tests resulted in an additional fifth match being added to the schedule. To warm up for that match, Miller took 3/95 against the North of England.

In the meantime Japan had surrendered, and No. 169 Squadron was disbanded. Miller had spent around 550 hours in the air with the RAF, to whom his RAAF unit had been seconded. For his active service he received the 1939–1945 Star, France and Germany Star, Defence Medal, War Medal 1939–45 and the Australia Service Medal 1939–45.

In the final Fifth Victory Test at Old Trafford, Australia batted first and had collapsed to 4/66 under overcast conditions on a green pitch when Miller came to the crease. Against a swinging and seaming ball, Miller struck 14 from the first over that he faced and went on to finish 77 not out in a display that featured strong cutting and driving as Australia could manage only 173. He took one wicket with the ball but managed only four in the second innings as England won by four wickets to square the series 2–2. Hassett wrote at the end of the series that "This is cricket as it should be...These games have shown that international cricket can be played as between real friends—so let's have no more talk of "war" in cricket". Miller topped the batting averages for the series, with 443 runs at 63.28. His aggregate exceeded that of Hammond and Hutton, who made 369 and 380 respectively. Miller also took 10 wickets at 27.70. Of Miller's batting, Hassett said that "as a strokeplayer he is second to none". his exploits in military teams led some to compare him to Jack Gregory, who had broken into top-flight cricket with his exploits with an AIF team immediately after the First World War.

The last big match of the season was a one-off at Lord's between England and Dominions, a combined team of players from the British Commonwealth. Miller managed 26 in the Dominions' first innings of 307, before coming to the crease at 2/60 in the second innings with England still leading by 80 runs. Miller settled in quickly, hitting his second ball through the covers for four and moved to 49 in 49 minutes. He brought up his half-century by lifting Hollies straight back into the crowd. Three balls later, he hit another ball to the same point. At stumps, he was 61 not out with Dominions at 3/145. The next morning, his partner Martin Donnelly was dismissed and replaced by Dominions captain Learie Constantine. Miller then began his attack, hitting the dual leg spin pairing of Hollies and Wright to all parts of the ground. At one point, all the fielders except for the wicketkeeper and the bowler were on the fence.

He registered his century in 115 minutes, clouting another five balls over the boundary in the morning session. One of Miller's sixes travelled over 170 m in the air to Block Q next to the pavilion. He then aimed a lofted shot over long on from the bowling of Hollies, directly at the pavilion. It was still rising when it narrowly went over the press box and clipped the top of the roof. Test spinner James Langridge was brought on and Miller deposited two drives over the fence in his first over.

In one 35-minute passage of play, he and Constantine added 91 runs, before he departed for 185 from 165 minutes. He had scored a total of 124 runs in 115 minutes of batting in the morning session. Miller had struck a total of 13 fours and seven sixes, prompting Warner to say that in his 60 years of involvement in first-class cricket that he had "never seen such hitting".

The Dominions went on to win by 45 runs in a match described by Wisden as "one of the finest ever seen". Commenting of Miller' innings, Robertson-Glasgow said "From the moment he takes guard he plays each ball just that much below its supposed merits that scratches a bowler's pride". The former England player C. B. Fry said that Miller was "a batsman already great...who is likely, later on, to challenge the feats of Australia's champions of the past...Miller has something of the dash and generous abandon that were part of Victor Trumper's charm." Miller had enjoyed his visit to the home of cricket. In eight innings at Lord's for the season, he had scored 568 runs at 94.68 with three centuries. Wisden concluded

Miller's carefree attitude on the playing field enchanted spectators and he was a favourite of the English public. Miller attributed this to the fact that sport was trivial in comparison to war. When asked many years later by Michael Parkinson, about pressure on the cricket field, Miller responded with the famous quote: "pressure is a Messerschmitt up your arse, playing cricket is not".

The season ended with a few more matches against various English counties. Miller struck 81 not out in a low-scoring win against Nottinghamshire. In a match against Leveson-Gower's XI, which comprised Test-level England players, Miller struck 71 in just over an hour as the Australians finished at 506 and took an innings victory. Miller's time in England ended on a losing note when he scored a duck and eight and took 2/10 and 2/17 as the Australian Services lost to Surrey by three wickets. In matches that were given first-class status, Miller had score 725 runs at 72.50 for the season, finishing second in the averages and the aggregates. The success of the Australian Services team prompted the Foreign Minister of Australia Doc Evatt to ask the team to stop in India and Ceylon on their return to Australia to play in a fundraising tour for the Red Cross.

Services tour of India 
Miller, the vice-captain of the team, almost missed the trip to India after turning up late for the voyage. The servicemen arrived in Bombay and took a two-day train journey to Lahore to play North Zone. Miller scored 46 in a drawn match. The Australians headed to Delhi, but Miller missed the tour match due to food poisoning. He then led the Australians in a match against West Zone in Bombay with Hassett being rested. Miller top-scored with 106 in a high-scoring draw. In the first match against India at Bombay's Brabourne Stadium, regarded as unofficial Tests, Miller took two wickets: Rusi Modi in the first innings and Abdul Hafeez Kardar in the second. The match ended in a high-scoring draw with Miller unbeaten on 15 as Australia were 1/31 in pursuit of 112 for victory. At this point, with most of the team suffering from dysentery, some of the Australians became disenchanted with the long train journeys across the subcontinent, and tried to ask Hassett and manager Keith Johnson for air travel. When this was rejected, some of the RAAF personnel felt that Hassett should be removed, with Miller as one of the candidates to replace him. With Bradman likely to miss the upcoming tour of New Zealand, the Services captain would be one of the leading candidates to lead Australia. Miller refused to plot against Hassett and the dispute ended when Squadron Leader Stan Sismey arranged for a RAAF plane already in India to transport the team. On the first flight to Calcutta, the squad survived an electrical storm that caused the plane to drop altitude.

The team was scheduled to play East Zone, but the city was gripped in deadly riots as independence activists agitated against British rule. The match went ahead, but on the first day, thousands of protestors invaded the pitch, interrupting play for an hour. Elsewhere in the city, 23 people were killed. Miller scored only 17 and one, both times dismissed by Chandu Sarwate, and did not bowl. On the final day, Miller's friend Compton, who was playing for East Zone while on deployment with the British Army in India, was nearing a century as his team closed in on victory. The rioters broke through the security presence and invaded the pitch again. The leader of the demonstrators ran up to Compton and said: "Mr Compton, you very good player, but you must stop". In later years, Miller would quote this remark whenever Compton came to the crease in matches featuring both of them. Compton told the rioters to ask Hassett, saying that the Australian skipper controlled proceedings. Hassett smiled at the leader of the irate demonstrators and asked "You wouldn't happen to have a cigarette, would you, old boy?" The rioters calmed down and play resumed. Compton brought up his century with the winning runs. In 2005, the ECB and Cricket Australia decided that the player adjudged the Player of the Series in the Ashes would be awarded the Compton-Miller Medal, recognising their friendship and rivalry.

In the second match against India, the Australians were 2/250 in response to India's 386 when Miller came in and hit Vinoo Mankad for four sixes from five balls, before falling to the said bowler for 82. The match ended in a draw, with Miller not taking a wicket after aggravating an injury. Captaining the team, Miller took 3/19 and 1/8 in a match against South Zone in Madras, the Australians' only win on Indian soil. However, he had a difficult time with the bat, falling twice to Ghulam Ahmed for a duck and eight. He failed with the bat in the third and final match against India, falling twice to Shute Banerjee for two and seven, but he took 2/60 in the first innings as India took the series 1–0. Miller had a disappointing series in the international matches, with 107 runs at 26.25 and four wickets at 40.50. Australia's final match was in Colombo against an All Ceylon team.  Miller scored 132 and took 2/37 as Australia won by an innings. Not wanting to wait a month for the next boat and a fortnight's sea voyage, the Australians returned to Perth by hitching a ride on a B-24 Liberator. The pilot of the RAAF plane had already promised 14 friends a lift so that they would not be stuck in India for another six months, so the Australian team sat on the floor of the aircraft. They made it back to Australia despite suffering engine trouble and an overloaded plane.

Services matches in Australia 

Upon returning to Australia, Hassett's men were informed by the military and the Australian Board of Control that the Services were to play a further six first-class matches against the state teams. Miller was tired but the fixtures were meant to revive cricket following the war and were also used as a lead-up to the international tour to New Zealand in March 1946.

Miler started his campaign for Test selection when the servicemen arrived in Perth and played their first match against Western Australia. Miller put in his best batting performance of the season with an 80 in a drawn match, before being rested in the match against South Australia at the Adelaide Oval, which again ended in a draw. Miller finally returned to his home town on 2 January 1946 and was reunited with family and friends before taking on Victoria. Miller top-scored in both innings with 37 and 59 as the military men fell to an innings defeat, troubled by the off spin of Ian Johnson. Miller and the servicemen had another difficult time against New South Wales, as their opponents made 7/551 and Miller went wicketless. Miller faced his biggest challenge in Australian conditions in his quest for Test selection when he went out to bat. The Australian selectors had not been in England for the Victory Tests to witness his ability and Miller had not played to his potential on Australian soil. Local Australian opinion was that because the Services had played poorly in Australia, their achievements in England must have been against poor opposition.

He was pitted against Bill O'Reilly, the leg spinner regarded as the best bowler in the world, and Ray Lindwall, an emerging bowler of express pace, the fastest in Australia. Miller accumulated slowly and was on 74 as Services limped to 9/171. Services had no batsmen left with one man injured and retired hurt, so O'Reilly allowed the twelfth man to bat, in order to give Miller a chance of making a century. Miller attacked and scored 31 of the last 33 runs, ending with an unbeaten 105, with 11 fours in 172 minutes. He earned plaudits among cricket pundits on Australian soil. Former leading Test batsman Alan Kippax opined that "Australia has unearthed a new champion", claiming that he was finer than Jack Gregory and saying that "few batsmen I have watched have had his ability to blend beauty and power". O'Reilly said that Miller's century was "one of the best hundreds ever got against me". Miller compiled 46 in the second innings before being bowled by O'Reilly as the Servicemen fell to another innings defeat. Miller finished the season with 2/74 and 4/49 in a drawn match against Queensland and a pair of fifties in a drawn match against Tasmania. Miller ended the season with 463 runs at 57.88 and six wickets at 31.83.

Miller was selected for Australia's tour of New Zealand, and made his Test debut there. Upon returning to Australia, he was discharged from the RAAF on 26 June 1946.

Notes

References

Australian World War II pilots
Military career

Military careers by individual